Gmina Białobrzegi may refer to either of the following administrative districts in Poland:
Gmina Białobrzegi, Masovian Voivodeship
Gmina Białobrzegi, Subcarpathian Voivodeship